Unified messaging (or UM) is a business term for the integration of different electronic messaging and communications media (e-mail, SMS, fax, voicemail, video messaging, etc.) technologies into a single interface, accessible from a variety of different devices. 
While traditional communications systems delivered messages into several different types of stores such as voicemail systems, e-mail servers, and stand-alone fax machines, with Unified Messaging all types of messages are stored in one system. Voicemail messages, for example, can be delivered directly into the user's inbox and played either through a headset or the computer's speaker.  This simplifies the user's experience (only one place to check for messages) and can offer new options for workflow such as appending notes or documents to forwarded voicemails.

Unified messaging is increasingly accepted in the corporate environment, where it's generally seen as an improvement to business productivity. Unified messaging for professional settings integrates communications processes into the existing IT infrastructure, i. e. into CRM, ERP and mail systems.

Hype 
Definitions of unified messaging vary from the typical definition of simple inclusion of incoming faxes and voice-mail in one's email inbox, all the way to dictating a message into a cell phone and the intelligent delivery of that message to the intended recipient in a variety of possible formats like text email, fax, or voice recording. Because of the nebulous definition of UM, it was number one on the 1998 Wired Magazine "Hype List".

Difference from unified communications 
Unified messaging is not to be mistaken for unified communications, although the two share some similarities. Hosted UC services lack real-time communication options like IM and presence-based telephone connections because they not demanded by the majority of hosted SMB customers. So while unified messaging can be included in unified communications, not all unified communication services are related to unified messaging.

See also
 Real time enterprise
 Presence service
 Unified communications

References 

Messaging